Cox Green is a village in the Sunderland district, Tyne and Wear, England, situated on the south bank of the River Wear between Penshaw and Offerton. The village is linked to Washington Staithes on the north bank of the river, by the Cox Green Footbridge. It is primarily a residential village.

Etymology
Cox Green is from Old English cocc "cock" (crest of a hill) in the plural form coccs (the plural form represented by modern "s"). Due to corruption of the name over the years, the name is similar to the modern surname Cox. The name was recorded as Cosse in 1108, and Couuse in 1146 and Cokksgrene in 1248. 'Green' is a modern addition, referring to the village. As of January 2010, there are 23 people living in the village. There is a pub called the Oddfellows Arms.

Roads & transport
Cox Green is situated to the north of the A183 road, about a mile west of its intersection with the main A19 trunk road. It had a railway station from the 1850s until 1964, which unsurprisingly fell victim to the Beeching Axe.

References

External links

Villages in Tyne and Wear
City of Sunderland